The 1914 Minnesota Golden Gophers football team represented the University of Minnesota in the 1914 college football season. In their 15th year under head coach Henry L. Williams, the Golden Gophers compiled a 6–1 record (3–1 against Western Conference opponents), finished in second place in the conference, and outscored their opponents by a combined total of 123 to 44. The team's only loss came to conference and national champion Illinois.

Lorin Solon was named an All-American by the Associated Press.  Solon was also named All-Big Ten first team.

Schedule

Roster
Francis "Frank" Moudry (#2 in team photo above)

References

Minnesota
Minnesota Golden Gophers football seasons
Minnesota Golden Gophers football